Hypnodendraceae is a family of mosses belonging to the order Hypnodendrales.

Genera:
 Braithwaitea 
 Dendrohypnum Hampe, 1872
 Hypnodendron (Müll. Hal.) Lindb. ex Mitt.
 Mniodendron Lindb. ex Dozy & Molk.
 Sciadocladus S.O.Lindberg ex V.F.Brotherus, 1909
 Touwiodendron N.E.Bell, A.E.Newton & D.Quandt, 2007

References

Bryopsida
Moss families